Wibke Bülle (also spelled Buelle, born 14 March 1970) is a German former sailor. She competed in the women's 470 event at the 2000 Summer Olympics.

References

External links
 
 

1970 births
Living people
German female sailors (sport)
Olympic sailors of Germany
Sailors at the 2000 Summer Olympics – 470
People from Grevesmühlen
Sportspeople from Mecklenburg-Western Pomerania